Beethoven's Fist is the third studio album by The Lime Spiders. It was released in 1990 through Virgin Records.

Track listing
 "Scene of the Crime" (Mick Blood, Gerard Corben) - 4:11
 "Cherry Red" (Mick Blood, Phil Hall) - 2:44
 "Real Thing" (Mick Blood, Phil Hall, C Morrow) - 3:56
 "9 Miles High" (Mick Blood, Phil Hall) - 2:59
 "I Get Off at the Next Stop" (Mick Blood) - 5:14
 "This Time" (Mick Blood) - 3:52
 "Silent Partner" (Mick Blood, Gerard Corben) - 2:30
 "Old Dog New Tricks" (Mick Blood) - 2:34
 "Three Wise Men" (Mick Blood, Richard Lawson) - 3:24
 "Miss Perfect Strange" (Mick Blood, Gerard Corben) - 3:35

Personnel

Lime Spiders
Mick Blood - vocals
Gerard Corben - guitars
Richard Lawson - drums, vocals
Phil Hall - bass guitar

Additional musicians
Mark Wilkinson - guitar

References

1990 albums
Lime Spiders albums